Occupational Medicine is a peer-reviewed medical journal covering occupational medicine. It is published eight times per year by Oxford University Press. The journal covers "work-related injury and illness, accident and illness prevention, health promotion, occupational disease, health education, the establishment and implementation of health and safety standards, monitoring of the work environment, and the management of recognized hazards". It was established in 1948.

Abstracting and indexing
The journal is covered by several major indexing services including: 
 CAB Abstracts 
 Current Contents/Clinical Medicine 
 EMBASE
 Environmental Science and Pollution Management
 Ergonomics Abstracts
 Excerpta Medica
 PubMed 
 Science Citation Index

References 

English-language journals
Occupational safety and health journals